Funtington is a village and civil parish in the Chichester district of West Sussex, England. It lies on the B2146 Road 4.5 miles (7.2 km) west of Chichester. The parish also contains the villages of East and West Ashling, West Stoke and the Kingley Vale National Nature Reserve lies at its northern tip.  There is a farm produce shop and a pub at the centre of the village. Funtington Primary School is in the village of West Ashling.

Governance

An electoral ward in the same name exists. This ward stretches north to Compton with a total population taken at the 2011 census of 2,671.

Religious sites
St. Mary's Anglican church, dating from the 12th Century, is the principal church in the parish of Funtington.

St. Andrew's church at West Stoke is of Saxon origin. The chapel of St. Mary's at Sennicotts lies about two miles (3 km) to the east, off the Chichester road.

The Old Congregational Chapel
The old Congregational Chapel, is a Grade II listed building, situated on the road between East Ashling and Funtington, opposite the turning to West Ashling. The foundation stone of the chapel was laid on Friday, 18 September 1863. Most of the building material used was various stones, recovered from the fallen tower, of Chichester Cathedral. The tower having fallen down during a storm in 1861. The Chapel closed, as place of worship, between 1934 and 1938. It became a scout headquarters for a while and then  a clock museum run by the Clock trust.

Landmarks
Kingley Vale lies on the border of the parish which is a Site of Special Scientific Interest and a national nature reserve. It is noted for its Yew woodlands. The site is also known for its archaeological interest including Bronze Age and Roman earthworks, cross dykes, a camp and a field system.

Marshal of the Royal Air Force Charles Portal, 1st Viscount Portal of Hungerford,  (1893–1971) lived at West Ashling and is buried in Funtington churchyard.

Pat Porteous  (1918-2000) who took part in the raid on Dieppe in August 1942 is buried in St Mary's churchyard.

Gallery

Notes

References

External links

Villages in West Sussex